Edwin Jeffrey Saugestad (January, 1937 – March 20, 2014) was an American ice hockey coach.  From 1958 to 1996, he was the head hockey coach at Augsburg College in Minneapolis, Minnesota.  He led the Augsburg hockey team to three National Association of Intercollegiate Athletics men's ice hockey championships and six consecutive Minnesota Intercollegiate Athletic Conference championships from 1976 to 1982.  At the time of his retirement in 1996, he ranked second in career wins in NCAA Division III history.  He received the John MacInnes Award in 2002 for his lifetime of contributions to amateur hockey and the Hobey Baker Legends of College Hockey Award in 2007. As of 2010, he ranks 18th all-time among college men's ice hockey coaches with 503 wins.

Augsburg College
Saugestad became the hockey coach at Augsburg College during his senior year at the school.  He was both a player and coach on the team during the 1958–59 hockey season.  Saugestad graduated in 1959 with a double major in physical education and biology.  He also received a master's degree from the University of Minnesota in 1964.

With the exception of a sabbatical in the 1990–91 academic year, Saugestad was the head ice hockey coach at Augsburg from the 1958–59 season through the 1995–96 season.  In 37 years as the head hockey coach, he led Augsburg to three National Association of Intercollegiate Athletics ("NAIA") national hockey championships in 1978, 1981 and 1982.  His Augsburg hockey teams also won six consecutive Minnesota Intercollegiate Athletic Conference ("MIAC") championships from 1976 to 1982 and appeared in ten post-season tournaments.  He coached 22 players who received All-American honors at Augsburg.

Saugestad was also an instructor in the Health & Physical Education Department until 1996 and taught classes in, among other things, the physiology of exercise and health.  He also served on the coaching staff for Augsburg's football team from 1959 to 1984.  In December 1969, Saugestad was named the head football coach after Edor Nelson resigned the position.  Saugestad was the head football coach during the 1970 and 1971 football seasons.  From 1981 to 1987, he was also Augsburg's men's athletic director.

In the fall of 1995, Saugestad's left kidney shut down, and he underwent six surgeries to diagnose and remove a non-malignant growth.  As a result of his health problems, Saugestad announced at the end of November 1995 that the 1995–96 hockey season would be his last as a coach.  He told reporters that his health problems had made him reorder his priorities, "It made me think about what things I wanted to do, like go backpacking off in the Boundary Waters."  The Minneapolis Star-Tribune wrote at the time, "Kidney problems have accomplished what no opposing team or set of circumstances could: Force Ed Saugestad from his beloved coaching after this season."

Saugestad recorded his 500th career victory in January 1996 with a 5-4 win over Bethel University.  Saugestad said at the time, "I have to say, I'm kind of glad to get it out of the way and get back to normal.  Everyone kept talking about it.  ... Now that it's done, it's quite a milestone.  It's wonderful.  It took a lot of guys to get it for me."  In his final game as Augsburg's coach, freshman goalie Shawn Mullan stopped 45 shots, and Augsburg scored six unanswered goals to beat Gustavus Adolphus College for Saugestad's 503rd and final career win.

Career coaching record and honors
At the time of his retirement, Saugestad was the second winningest hockey coach in NCAA Division III history. He has received many awards and honors for his contributions to college ice hockey. These include:
 NAIA Coach of the Year in 1978, 1981 and 1982 and the MIAC Coach of the Year six times.
 In 1987, Saugestad was inducted into the Augsburg College Hall of Fame.
 The State of Minnesota declared February 17, 1996, the day of Saugestad's last game as the hockey coach at Augsburg, as "Ed Saugestad Day."
 In 1998, the MIAC renamed its championship trophy in hockey as the Ed Saugestad Trophy.
In 2002, the American Hockey Coaches Association awarded the John MacInnes Award to Saugestad for his lifetime of contributions to amateur hockey.
In 2007, the Hobey Baker Memorial Award Foundation presented Saugestad with its Hobey Baker Legends of College Hockey Award.
In 2009, Augsburg College announced plans to rename its main ice rink the Ed Saugestad Rink at Augsburg Ice Arena.  The naming ceremony for Ed Saugestad Rink is scheduled for October 16, 2010.

Head coaching record

Ice hockey

Football

See also
 List of college men's ice hockey coaches with 400 wins

References

Year of birth missing
1930s births
2014 deaths
American ice hockey coaches
American men's ice hockey players
Augsburg Auggies athletic directors
Augsburg Auggies football coaches
Augsburg Auggies men's ice hockey coaches
Augsburg Auggies men's ice hockey players
Ice hockey coaches from Minnesota
Ice hockey players from Minnesota